Afrikaners are a South African ethnic group.

Afrikaner may also refer to:

 The Afrikaner dynasty of the Oorlam people in Namibia
 Afrikaner cattle, an indigenous South African breed of cattle historically primarily kept and herded by the Khoikhoi people
 Afrikaner sheep, an indigenous South African sheep breed
 HMSAS Afrikander, Navy, Gadfly-class flat-iron gunboat
 Some species of Gladiolus